Carbaminohemoglobin (carbaminohaemoglobin BrE) (CO2Hb, also known as carbhemoglobin and carbohemoglobin) is a compound of hemoglobin and carbon dioxide, and is one of the forms in which carbon dioxide exists in the blood.  Twenty-three percent of carbon dioxide is carried in blood this way (70% is converted into  bicarbonate by carbonic anhydrase and then carried in plasma, 7% carried as free CO2, dissolved in plasma).

Synthesis 
When the tissues release carbon dioxide into the bloodstream, around 10% is dissolved into the plasma. The rest of the carbon dioxide is carried either directly or indirectly by hemoglobin. Approximately 10% of the carbon dioxide carried by hemoglobin is in the form of carbaminohemoglobin. This carbaminohemoglobin is formed by the reaction between carbon dioxide and an amino (-NH2) residue from the globin molecule, resulting in the formation of a carbamino residue (-NH.COO−). The rest of the carbon dioxide is transported in the plasma as bicarbonate anions.

Mechanism 
When carbon dioxide binds to hemoglobin, carbaminohemoglobin is formed, lowering hemoglobin's affinity for oxygen via the Bohr effect. The reaction is formed between a carbon dioxide molecule and an amino residue. In the absence of oxygen, unbound hemoglobin molecules have a greater chance of becoming carbaminohemoglobin. Because the formation of this compound generates hydrogen ions, haemoglobin is needed to buffer it.

Hemoglobin can bind to four molecules of carbon dioxide. The carbon dioxide molecules form a carbamate with the four terminal-amine groups of the four protein chains in the deoxy form of the molecule. Thus, one hemoglobin molecule can transport four carbon dioxide molecules back to the lungs, where they are released when the molecule changes back to the oxyhemoglobin form.

Hydrogen Ion and Oxygen-Carbon Dioxide Coupling 
When carbon dioxide diffuses as a dissolved gas from the tissue capillaries, it binds to the α-amino terminus of the globulin chain, forming Carbaminohemoglobin. Carbaminohemoglobin is able to directly stabilise the T conformation as part of the carbon dioxide Bohr effect. Deoxyhemoglobin in turn subsequently increases the uptake of carbon dioxide in the form of favouring the formation of Bicarbonate as well as Carbaminohemoglobin through the Haldane effect.

See also
 Hemoglobin
 Blood
 Carbamic acid
 Carbamino

References

External links
 

Biomolecules
Hemoglobins